Printing in East Asia originated from the Han dynasty (220 BCE – 206 CE) in China, evolving from ink rubbings made on paper or cloth from texts on stone tables used during the Han. Printing is considered one of the Four Great Inventions of China that spread throughout the world. A specific type of printing called mechanical woodblock printing on paper started in China during the Tang dynasty before the 8th century CE. The use of woodblock printing spread throughout Asia, and the idea of printing perhaps spread to Europe, where German publisher and inventor Johannes Gutenberg improved on the design with the introduction of the mechanical press in the mid-15th century. As recorded in 1088 by Shen Kuo in his Dream Pool Essays, the Chinese artisan Bi Sheng invented an early form of movable type using clay and wood pieces arranged and organized for written Chinese characters. The use of metal movable type was known in Korea by the 13th century during the Goryeo period. In Korea the first movable types date from 1239/1240. A further discovery was made in 2009, and here the types were dated to the year 1377.

From the 17th century to the 19th century in Japan, woodblock prints called ukiyo-e were mass-produced, which influenced European Japonisme and the Impressionists. The European-style printing press became known in East Asia by the 16th century but was not adopted. Centuries later, mechanical printing presses combining some European influences were adopted, but then replaced with newer laser printing systems designed in the 20th and 21st centuries.

Woodblock printing 

Woodblock printing started in China in 593 CE. Traditionally, there have been two main printing techniques in East Asia: woodblock printing (xylography) and moveable type printing. In the woodblock technique, ink is applied to letters carved upon a wooden board, which is then pressed onto paper. With moveable type, the board is assembled using different lettertypes, according to the page being printed. Wooden printing was used in the East from the 8th century onwards, and moveable metal type came into use during the 12th century.

The earliest specimen of woodblock printing on paper, whereby individual sheets of paper were pressed into wooden blocks with the text and illustrations carved into them, was discovered in 1974 in an excavation of Xi'an (then called Chang'an, the capital of Tang China), Shaanxi, China. It is a dharani sutra printed on hemp paper and dated to 650 to 670 CE, during the Tang dynasty (618–907). Another printed document dating to the early half of the Chinese Tang dynasty has also been found, the Saddharmapunṇḍarīka sutra or Lotus Sutra printed from 690 to 699.

In Korea, an example of woodblock printing from the eighth century was discovered in 1966. A copy of the Buddhist Dharani Sutra called the Pure Light Dharani Sutra, discovered in Gyeongju, South Korea in a Silla dynasty pagoda that was repaired in 751 CE, was undated but must have been created sometime before the reconstruction of the Shakyamuni Pagoda of Bulguk Temple, Kyongju Province in 751 CE. The document is estimated to have been created no later than 704 AD.

The printing process 
The manuscript is transcribed onto thin slightly waxed sheets of paper by a professional calligrapher. The wax prevents the ink from being as readily absorbed into the paper, allowing more ink to be absorbed onto another surface. The paper is placed ink side down onto a wooden block on which a thin layer of rice paste has been thinly spread.  The back of the paper is rubbed with a flat palm-fibre brush so that the wet rice paste absorbs some of the ink and an impression of the inked area is left on the block. The engraver uses a set of sharp-edged tools to cut away the uninked areas of the wood block in essence raising an inverse image of the original calligraphy above the background.

While carving, the knife is held like a dagger in the right hand and guided by the middle finger of the left hand, drawing towards the cutter. The vertical lines are cut first, then the block is rotated 90 degrees and the horizontal lines cut.

Four proof-readings are normally required – the transcript, the corrected transcript, first sample print from block and after any corrections have been made. A small correction to a block can be made by cutting a small notch and hammering in a wedge-shaped piece of wood. Larger errors require an inlay. After this the block is washed to remove any refuse.

To print, the block is fixed firmly on a table. The printer takes a round horsehair inking brush and applies ink with a vertical motion. The paper is then laid on the block and rubbed with a long narrow pad to transfer the impression to the paper. The paper is peeled off and set to dry. Because of the rubbing process, printing is only done on one side of the paper, and the paper is thinner than in the west, but two pages are normally printed at once.

Sample copies were sometimes made in red or blue, but black ink was always used for production. It is said that a skilled printer could produce as many as 1500 or 2000 double sheets in a day. Blocks can be stored and reused when extra copies are needed. 15,000 prints can be taken from a block with a further 10,000 after touching up.

Spread of printing across East Asia

Japan 

In 764 the Empress Kōken commissioned one million small wooden pagodas, each containing a small woodblock scroll printed with a Buddhist text (Hyakumantō Darani).  These were distributed to temples around the country as thanks for the suppression of the Emi Rebellion of 764. These are the earliest examples of woodblock printing known, or documented, from Japan.

In the Kamakura period from the 12th century to the 13th century, many books were printed and published by woodblock printing at Buddhist temples in Kyoto and Kamakura.

In Japan, from the Edo period in the 1600s, books and illustrations were mass-produced by woodblock printing and spread among the common people. This is due to economic development and a very high literacy rate for the time. The literacy rate of the Japanese in the Edo period was almost 100% for the samurai class and 50% to 60% for the chōnin and nōmin (farmer) class due to the spread of private schools terakoya. There were more than 600 rental bookstores in Edo, and people lent woodblock-printed illustrated books of various genres. The content of these books varied widely, including travel guides, gardening books, cookbooks, kibyōshi (satirical novels), sharebon (books on urban culture), kokkeibon (comical books), ninjōbon (romance novel), yomihon, kusazōshi, art books, play scripts for the kabuki and jōruri (puppet) theatre, etc. The best-selling books of this period were Kōshoku Ichidai Otoko (Life of an Amorous Man) by Ihara Saikaku, Nansō Satomi Hakkenden by Takizawa Bakin, and Tōkaidōchū Hizakurige by Jippensha Ikku, and these books were reprinted many times.

From the 17th century to the 19th century, ukiyo-e depicting secular subjects became very popular among the common people and were mass-produced. ukiyo-e is based on kabuki actors, sumo wrestlers, beautiful women, landscapes of sightseeing spots, historical tales, and so on, and Hokusai and Hiroshige are the most famous artists. In the 18th century, Suzuki Harunobu established the technique of multicolor woodblock printing called nishiki-e and greatly developed Japanese woodblock printing culture such as ukiyo-e. Ukiyo-e influenced European Japonism and Impressionism. In the early 20th century, shin-hanga that fused the tradition of ukiyo-e with the techniques of Western paintings became popular, and the works of Hasui Kawase and Hiroshi Yoshida gained international popularity.

Korea 
Printing was also promoted by the spread of Buddhism. The Buddhist scroll known as the "Great Dharani Sutra of Immaculate and Pure Light" or "Spotless Pure Light Dharani Sutra". It was published in Korea before the year 751 CE during the Silla Kingdom. This Darani Sutra was found inside the Seokga Pagoda of Bulguksa Temple in Gyeongju, Korea. Bulguksa Temple in Gyeongju in October 1966 within the seokgatap (释迦塔) while dismantling the tower to repair much of the sari was found with the prints. It was once considered the oldest extant woodblock print, however archaeological discoveries since 1966 have pushed the earliest printed texts earlier in China. One row of the darani gyeongmun 8–9 are printed in the form of a roll. Tripitaka Koreana was printed between 1011 and 1082. It is the world's most comprehensive and oldest intact version of Buddhist canon. A reprint in 1237–51 used 81,258 blocks of magnolia wood, carved on both sides, which are still kept almost intact at Haeinsa. A printing office was established in the National Academy in 1101 and the Goryeo government collection numbered several tens of thousands.

Expansion into the Western World 
The idea of the printing press expanded from East Asia to the Western World, starting in China's Xiyu or Western Regions (西域 historically territories covering Xinjiang and parts of Central Asia that were ruled by the Han and Tang dynasties). In the Xiyu, printing in the Uyghur language appeared in about 1300, with the page numbers and descriptions are in Chinese characters. Both blocks and moveable type printing has been discovered at Turfan as well as several hundred wooden type for Uighur. After the Mongols conquered Turfan, a great number of Uighurs were recruited into the Mongol army. After the Mongols conquered Persia in the middle of the 13th century, paper money was printed in Tabriz in 1294, following the Chinese system. A description of the Chinese printing system was made by Rashid-al-Din Hamadani in 1301–11 in his history (see Rashid-al-Din Hamadani#Book transmission: printing and translation).

Some fifty pieces of Medieval Arabic blockprinting have been found in Egypt printed between 900 and 1300 in black ink on paper by the rubbing method in the Chinese style. Although there is no transmission evidence, experts believe this originated from China.

According to the American art historian A. Hyatt Mayor, "it was the Chinese who really discovered the means of communication that was to dominate until our age." Both woodblock and movable type printing were replaced in the second half of the 19th century by western-style printing, initially lithography.

Movable type

Ceramic movable type in China 
Bi Sheng (毕昇) (990–1051) developed the first known movable-type system for printing in China around 1040 AD during the Northern Song dynasty, using ceramic materials. As described by the Chinese scholar Shen Kuo (沈括) (1031–1095):

When he wished to print, he took an iron frame and set it on the iron plate. In this he placed the types, set close together. When the frame was full, the whole made one solid block of type. He then placed it near the fire to warm it. When the paste [at the back] was slightly melted, he took a smooth board and pressed it over the surface, so that the block of type became as even as a whetstone.

For each character there were several types, and for certain common characters there were twenty or more types each, in order to be prepared for the repetition of characters on the same page. When the characters were not in use he had them arranged with paper labels, one label for each rhyme-group, and kept them in wooden cases.

If one were to print only two or three copies, this method would be neither simple nor easy. But for printing hundreds or thousands of copies, it was marvelously quick. As a rule he kept two forms going. While the impression was being made from the one form, the type was being put in place on the other. When the printing of the one form was finished, the other was then ready. In this way the two forms alternated and the printing was done with great rapidity.

In 1193, Zhou Bida, an officer of Southern Song Dynasty, made a set of the clay movable-type method according to the method described by Shen Kuo in his Dream Pool Essays, and printed his book Notes of The Jade Hall (《玉堂杂记》).

Clay type printing was practiced in China from the Song dynasty through the Qing dynasty. As late as 1844 there were still books printed in China with ceramic movable types. (However,  ceramic type was not used during the Ming dynasty, and it was not until the middle of the Qing dynasty that its usage revived).  Ceramic type not holding Chinese ink well and distortion of the type sometimes occurring during the baking process contributed in preventing it from being popular

Wooden movable type in China 
Wooden movable type was also first developed around 1040 AD by Bi Sheng (990–1051), as described by the Chinese scholar Shen Kuo (1031–1095), but was abandoned in favour of clay movable types due to the presence of wood grains and the unevenness of the wooden type after being soaked in ink.

In 1298, Wang Zhen, a Yuan dynasty governmental official of Jingde County, Anhui Province, China, re-invented a method of making movable wooden types. He made more than 30,000 wooden movable types and printed 100 copies of Records of Jingde County (《旌德县志》), a book of more than 60,000 Chinese characters. Soon afterwards, he summarized his invention in his book A method of making moveable wooden types for printing books. This system was later enhanced by pressing wooden blocks into sand and casting metal types from the depression in copper, bronze, iron or tin. This new method overcame many of the shortcomings of woodblock printing. Rather than manually carving an individual block to print a single page, movable type printing allowed for the quick assembly of a page of text. Furthermore, these new, more compact type fonts could be reused and stored. The set of wafer-like metal stamp types could be assembled to form pages, inked, and page impressions taken from rubbings on cloth or paper. In 1322, a Fenghua county officer Ma Chengde (马称德) in Zhejiang, made 100,000 wooden movable types and printed 43 volume Daxue Yanyi (《大学衍义》). Wooden movable types were used continually in China. Even as late as 1733, a 2300-volume Wuying Palace Collected Gems Edition (《武英殿聚珍版丛书》) was printed with 253,500 wooden movable type on order of the Yongzheng Emperor, and completed in one year.

A number of books printed in Tangut script during the Western Xia (1038–1227) period are known, of which the Auspicious Tantra of All-Reaching Union that was discovered in the ruins of Baisigou Square Pagoda in 1991 is believed to have been printed sometime during the reign of Emperor Renzong of Western Xia (1139–1193). It is considered by many Chinese experts to be the earliest extant example of a book printed using wooden movable type.

A particular difficulty posed the logistical problems of handling the several thousand logographs whose command is required for full literacy in the Chinese language. It was faster to carve one woodblock per page than to composite a page from so many different types. However, if one was to use movable type for multitudes of the same document, the speed of printing would be relatively quicker.

Although the wooden type was more durable under the mechanical rigors of handling, repeated printing wore the character faces down, and the types could only be replaced by carving new pieces. In addition, wooden type could apparently absorb moisture and the print form would be uneven when set up, and the wooden type could be more difficult to remove from the paste used in the form.

Metal movable type in China 
Bronze movable type printing was invented in China no later than the 12th century, according to at least 13 material finds in China, in large scale bronze plate printing of paper money and formal official documents issued by Jin (1115–1234) and Southern Song (1127–1279) dynasties with embedded bronze metal types for anti counterfeit markers. Such paper money printing might date back to the 11th-century  jiaozi of Northern Song (960–1127). However, problems existed in using metal type in printing text, and it was not until the late 15th century that metal movable type was widely used in China.

The typical example of this kind of bronze movable type embedded copper-block printing is a printed "check" of Jin Dynasty with two square holes for embedding two bronze movable type characters, each selected from 1000 different characters, such that each printed paper money has a different combination of markers. A copper block printed paper money dated between 1215–1216 in the collection of Luo Zhenyu's Pictorial Paper Money of the Four Dynasties, 1914, shows two special characters one called Ziliao, the other called Zihao for the purpose of preventing counterfeit; over the Ziliao there is a small character (輶) printed with movable copper type, while over the Zihao there is an empty square hole, apparently the associated copper metal type was lost. Another sample of Song dynasty money of the same period in the collection of Shanghai Museum has two empty square holes above Ziliao as well as Zihou, due to the loss of two copper movable types. Song dynasty bronze block embedded with bronze metal movable type printed paper money was issued in large scale and in circulation for a long time.

In the 1298 book Zao Huozi Yinshufa by the early Yuan dynasty (1271–1368) official Wang Zhen, there is mention of tin movable type, used probably since the Southern Song dynasty (1127–1279), but this was largely experimental. It was unsatisfactory due to its incompatibility with the inking process.

During the Mongol Empire (1206–1405), printing using movable type spread from China to Central Asia. The Uyghurs of Central Asia used movable type, their script type adopted from the Mongol language, some with Chinese words printed between the pages, a strong evidence that the books were printed in China.

During the Ming dynasty (1368–1644), Hua Sui in 1490 used bronze type in printing books. In 1574 the massive 1000 volume encyclopedia Imperial Readings of the Taiping Era were printed with bronze movable type.

In 1725, the Qing dynasty government made 250,000 bronze movable-type characters and printed 64 sets of the encyclopedic Gujin Tushu Jicheng (Complete Collection of Illustrations and Writings from the Earliest to Current Times). Each set consisted of 5040 volumes, making a total of 322,560 volumes printed using movable type.

Metal movable type in Korea 

The transition from wood type to movable metal type occurred in Korea during the Goryeo dynasty, some time in the 13th century, to meet the heavy demand for both religious and secular books. A set of ritual books, Sangjeong Gogeum Yemun were printed with movable metal type in 1234. The credit for the first metal movable type may go to Choe Yun-ui of the Goryeo Dynasty in 1234.

The techniques for bronze casting, used at the time for making coins (as well as bells and statues) were adapted to making metal type. Unlike the metal punch system thought to be used by Gutenberg, the Koreans used a sand-casting method. The following description of the Korean font casting process was recorded by the Joseon dynasty scholar Song Hyon (15th century):

At first, one cuts letters in beech wood. One fills a trough level with fine sandy  of the reed-growing seashore. Wood-cut letters are pressed into the sand, then the impressions become negative and form letters . At this step, placing one trough together with another, one pours the molten bronze down into an opening. The fluid flows in, filling these negative molds, one by one becoming type. Lastly, one scrapes and files off the irregularities, and piles them up to be arranged.

While metal movable type printing was developed in Korea and the oldest extant metal print book had been printed in Korea, Korea never witnessed a printing revolution comparable to Europe's:

Korean printing with movable metallic type developed mainly within the royal foundry of the Yi dynasty. Royalty kept a monopoly of this new technique and by royal mandate suppressed all non-official printing activities and any budding attempts at commercialization of printing. Thus, printing in early Korea served only the small, noble groups of the highly stratified society.

Nevertheless, the Korean peninsula saw the development of metal movable type, including the commissioning of 100,000 pieces of movable type and two complete fonts, by King Taejong of Joseon in 1403.

A potential solution to the linguistic and cultural bottleneck that held back movable type in Korea for two hundred years appeared in the early 15th century—a generation before Gutenberg would begin working on his own movable type invention in Europe—when Koreans devised a simplified alphabet of 24 characters called Hangul, which required fewer characters to typecast.

Movable type in Japan 
In Japan, the first Western style movable type printing-press was brought to Japan by Tenshō embassy in 1590, and was first printed in Kazusa, Nagasaki in 1591. However, western printing-press were discontinued after the ban on Christianity in 1614.
 The moveable type printing-press seized from Korea by Toyotomi Hideyoshi's forces in 1593 was also in use at the same time as the printing press from Europe. An edition of the Confucian Analects was printed in 1598, using a Korean moveable type printing press, at the order of Emperor Go-Yōzei.

Tokugawa Ieyasu established a printing school at Enko-ji in Kyoto and started publishing books using domestic wooden movable type printing-press instead of metal from 1599. Ieyasu supervised the production of 100,000 types, which were used to print many political and historical books. In 1605, books using domestic copper movable type printing-press began to be published, but copper type did not become mainstream after Ieyasu died in 1616.

The great pioneers in applying movable type printing press to the creation of artistic books, and in preceding mass production for general consumption, were Honami Kōetsu and Suminokura Soan. At their studio in Saga, Kyoto, the pair created a number of woodblock versions of the Japanese classics, both text and images, essentially converting emaki (handscrolls) to printed books, and reproducing them for wider consumption. These books, now known as Kōetsu Books, Suminokura Books, or Saga Books, are considered the first and finest printed reproductions of many of these classic tales; the Saga Book of the Tales of Ise (Ise monogatari), printed in 1608, is especially renowned. Saga Books were printed on expensive paper, and used various embellishments, being printed specifically for a small circle of literary connoisseurs.

Despite the appeal of moveable type, however, craftsmen soon decided that the running script style of Japanese writings was better reproduced using woodblocks. By 1640 woodblocks were once again used for nearly all purposes. After the 1640s, movable type printing declined, and books were mass-produced by conventional woodblock printing during most of the Edo period. It was after the 1870s, during the Meiji period, when Japan opened the country to the West and began to modernize, that this technique was used again.

Comparison of woodblock and movable type in East Asia 

Despite the introduction of movable type from the 11th century, printing using woodblocks remained dominant in East Asia until the introduction of lithography and photolithography in the 19th century. To understand this it is necessary to consider both the nature of the language and the economics of printing.

Given that the Chinese language does not use an alphabet it was usually necessary for a set of type to contain 100,000 or more blocks, which was a substantial investment. Common characters need 20 or more copies, and rarer characters only a single copy. In the case of wood, the characters were either produced in a large block and cut up, or the blocks were cut first and the characters cut afterwards. In either case the size and height of the type had to be carefully controlled to produce pleasing results. To handle the typesetting, Wang Zhen used revolving tables about 2m in diameter in which the characters were divided according to the five tones and the rhyme sections according to the official book of rhymes. The characters were all numbered and one man holding the list called out the number to another who would fetch the type.

This system worked well when the run was large. Wang Zhen's initial project to produce 100 copies of a 60,000 character gazetteer of the local district was produced in less than a month. But for the smaller runs typical of the time it was not such an improvement. A reprint required resetting and re-proofreading, unlike the wooden block system where it was feasible to store the blocks and reuse them. Individual wooden characters didn't last as long as complete blocks. When metal type was introduced it was harder to produce aesthetically pleasing type by the direct carving method.

It is unknown whether metal movable types used from the late 15th century in China were cast from moulds or carved individually. Even if they were cast, there were not the economies of scale available with the small number of different characters used in an alphabetic system. The wage for engraving on bronze was many times that for carving characters on wood and a set of metal type might contain 200,000–400,000 characters. Additionally, the ink traditionally used in Chinese printing, typically composed of pine soot bound with glue, didn't work well with the tin originally used for type.

As a result of all this, movable type was initially used by government offices which needed to produce large number of copies and by itinerant printers producing family registers who would carry perhaps 20,000 pieces of wooden type with them and cut any other characters needed locally. But small local printers often found that wooden blocks suited their needs better.

Mechanical presses 
Mechanical presses were then invented by Europeans. Instead, printing remained an unmechanized, laborious process with pressing the back of the paper onto the inked block by manual "rubbing" with a hand tool. In Korea, the first printing presses were introduced as late as 1881–83, while in Japan, after an early but brief interlude in the 1590s, Gutenberg's printing press arrived in Nagasaki in 1848 on a Dutch ship.

See also 
 History of Western typography
 Hua Sui
 Printing press
 Publishing industry in China
 Samuel Dyer
 Typography
 East Asian typography
Wang Zhen (inventor), also known as Wang Chen

References

Citations

Sources 

 Carter, Thomas Frances. The Invention of Printing in China, and its spread Westward 2nd ed., revised by L. Carrington Goodrich. NY:Ronald Press, 1955. (1st ed, 1925)
 Fifty Wonders of Korea: Volume 1. Seoul: Samjung Munhwasa, 2007. .
 Lane, Richard. (1978). Images from the Floating World, The Japanese Print. Oxford: Oxford University Press. ; OCLC 5246796
 ; also published in Taipei: Caves Books, Ltd., 1986.
 Twitchett, Denis. Printing and Publishing in Medieval China. New York, Frederick C. Beil, 1983.

External links 
 Chinese woodblock prints from SOAS University of London

East Asia
Printing in East Asia
History of science and technology in China
Science and technology in East Asia
Textual scholarship
Typography
Printing by continent